James Monroe High School is a public high school in Rochester, operated by the Rochester City School District.

History
James Monroe High School, located on Alexander Street at the corner of Pearl Street, was completed
and occupied as a Junior high school in September, 1923. In June; 1924, the first Junior
high school graduation exercises were held, and because of crowded conditions at East High
School, it was decided to retain tenth-year pupils in the school for at least a year. In
1926 it was permanently agreed that the school would be a Junior-senior high school; and the
cafeteria was erected on the site of the old No. 15 School adjacent to the playground. The
total cost of the school was $1,410,059.88, and of the cafeteria addition, $111,642.40. The building was known as Monroe Junior High School, 1923–1926; as Monroe High School, 1926–1931; as Monroe Junior Senior High School, 1931–1935; as Monroe High School, 1935–1988; Monroe Middle School, 1988–2005; and returned to a Junior-Senior high school in 2006.

Alma mater

Notable alumni
 David Diamond, composer
 Malcolm Glazer, investor and football team owner
 Daniel Katzen - 1970
 Mollie Katzen - 1968
 Alan Levin (aka Brother Wease) - 1965
 Arthur Rock, venture capitalist

Campus architecture
The stone and brick structure features Greek columns and a pediment on the main facade.

Curriculum
Monroe partners with local colleges and universities to offer learning in science and foreign language. The Advancement Via Individual Determination (AVID) program is available for grades 8 & 9.

The Monroe bilingual program is available for Spanish speaking students with limited English proficiency.
Extracurricular activities include music, sports, drama, art, and a variety of clubs.
The Student Support Center offers counseling, health, and academic services in partnership with community agencies.
Currently, uniforms are required for grades 7–8.

Language Academy at Monroe

The Language Academy at Monroe is an accelerated program designed for native Spanish speakers and English-speaking students interested in developing in Spanish. Students receive accelerated instruction in math and science, learn to use instructional technology, and gain a conceptual basis in literacy and social studies.

Advancement Via Individual Determination (AVID) program

Advancement Via Individual Determination (AVID) is a program at Monroe High School that serves students grades 8 & 9. This program is designed to prepare students for 4-year college entry. AVID is designed for the "middle of the road" student. These are students who have high potential despite average grades. The AVID class acts as an elective in the student's daily schedule. The AVID class instructor operates as a coach and provides intensive student support including study skills, test preparation and organization skills. The AVID program includes a site team of teachers, who focus on college preparation, writing, inquiry, and collaboration. The 2008–09 school year is the AVID program's inaugural year at Monroe High School. As of the 2011–2012 school year, the AVID program is no longer available at Monroe High School.

Bilingual Developmental Program

Monroe High School offers a full-day program for Spanish speakers who are English Language Learners and Former English Language Learners in Grades 7 and 8. The program is designed to provide instruction in Spanish and English in the content areas and ESOL services in a pull out and co-teaching model. Students are offered the academic language development experiences needed to develop the necessary English proficiency level required to meet the guidelines for graduation and become bilingual citizens in this global society.

Extracurriculars

Clubs and organizations
Art Club
Student Government
Yearbook
Newspaper
After School Tutoring Programs
National Honor Society
National Junior Honor Society
CMST Competition
Model UN

Sports

Performance

See also
Rochester City School District

References

External links

James Monroe High School

Public high schools in New York (state)
Education in Rochester, New York
High schools in Monroe County, New York
Public middle schools in New York (state)